Standish is a small town in the Metropolitan Borough of Wigan, Greater Manchester, England. Within the boundaries of the historic county of Lancashire, it is on the A49 road between Chorley and Wigan, near Junction 27 of the M6 motorway. The population of the town was 13,278 in the 2011 census.

Formed around a crossroads, the village has grown into a small town as urban expansion between Manchester and Liverpool extends outwards. St Wilfrid's Church is a Grade I listed parish church.

History
The name Standish is derived from the Old English stan, meaning stone, and edisc, a park or enclosure. It has been variously recorded as Stanedis in 1206, Stanediss in 1219, Standissh, Stanedich and Stanedissh in 1292 and Standisch in 1330. The adjoining village of Langtree was recorded as Langetre in 1206 and Longetre in 1330.
A Roman road passed through the township.

Standish and Langtree were part of the Penwortham barony in the 12th century, and between 1150 and 1164, Richard Bussel, Lord of Penwortham gave them to his brother-in-law Richard Spileman. In 1212 Thurstan Banastre held them and later they were held by William de Ferrers Earl of Derby, and then by 'the lords of Leylandshire'. The tenants adopted the local surnames, Standish and Langtree.

From the 13th century, the Standish family were  Lords of the Manor of Standish and owned the Standish Hall estate. The male line ended in 1755 with the death of Ralph Standish, and the estate was passed down through female lines until it was broken up in 1920. Standish Hall, whose oldest part dated from 1574, was demolished in stages during the 20th century. However, several of its wood-panelled interiors survive, most of which were transported to the US.

The Standish family were the main coal owners in the area, with their estate being mined since the 14th century. Coal mining in the area increased during the Industrial Revolution. During 1865–66, the Standish collieries were merged into the Wigan Coal and Iron Company. By 1896, Wigan Coal & Iron owned the Broomfield, Giant's Hall, Gidlow, John, Langtree, Robin Hill, Swire and Taylor Pits. The largest of these was the Langtree Pit with over 540 employees.

In 1900 the two 20 ft shafts of Wigan Coal's Victoria Colliery were sunk. This would continue to operate until its closure by the National Coal Board in 1958. It is now a housing estate.

Geography

The A49 trunk road passes through the centre of the village, on its way from Wigan to Chorley. Standish is served by Junction 27 of the M6 motorway, which is to the west of the village. The West Coast Main Line is on the eastern side of the village, around a mile from the centre. The River Douglas and Bradley Brook form the boundary on the eastern side of Standish. Mill Brook, which flows into the Douglas, forms the western boundary. Standish is situated on a ridge of high land which rises to 370 feet and runs north to south across the township, near the river the land is between 120 and 160 feet.

In the village, the area of Standish lies to the south (covering 1,696 acres), and the area of Langtree to the north (covering 1,568 acres) – historically some considered them to be separate townships.

Standish has soil and subsoil of clay and the underlying rocks are the coal measures of the Lancashire Coalfield.

Demography
Standish has a population of 13,278 people, based on the 2011 census, this represents 4.2% of the population of Wigan Borough. There is a higher than average number of residents over the age of 65, representing 19.9% of the population. It is an affluent community with seven out of the nine areas appearing within the top 30% most affluent in England. 80% of residents own their homes or have a mortgage; only 10% of households live in social housing.

Governance

Lying within the historic county boundaries of Lancashire since the early 12th century, Standish emerged as a township in the Middle Ages but by the mid-19th century was united with neighbouring Langtree, as Standish-with-Langtree. The township was in the larger Standish ecclesiastical parish.

Following the Poor Law Amendment Act 1834, Standish-with-Langtree formed part of the Wigan Poor Law Union, an inter-parish unit established to administer the Poor Law which made use of premises on Frog Lane Wigan and Hindley. Standish-with-Langtree became a local board of health established in 1872; Standish-with-Langtree Local Board of Health was a regulatory body responsible for standards of hygiene and sanitation in the township. Following the Local Government Act 1894, the area of the local board became an urban district within the administrative county of Lancashire.

Under the Local Government Act 1972, the Standish-with-Langtree Urban District was abolished, and Standish has, since 1 April 1974, formed an unparished area of the Metropolitan Borough of Wigan, a local government district of the metropolitan county of Greater Manchester. For electoral purposes, the village is within the Standish With Langtree Ward.

Standish Voice
The residents' group Standish Voice, was formed in July 2014. In May 2015, it was designated as the Neighbourhood Forum for Standish, with the aim of creating a Neighbourhood Plan for the village. Following a Neighbourhood Referendum on 18 July 2019, Standish Neighbourhood Plan 2015–2030 was adopted into the development plan for Wigan borough (with 94.5% voting in favour). The legally-binding document covers the use and development of land; and guides future development, regeneration and conservation of the area.

Landmarks

There are 22 Listed buildings in Standish, including one with a Grade I listing and two at Grade II*.

St Wilfrid's Parish Church is the only building with a Grade I listing in the Metropolitan Borough of Wigan. In the Market Place in front of the church is a late medieval cross, stone stocks and a 14th-century well.

Standish has the 22-acre Ashfield Park which contains a mixture of woodland, open green-space and recreational facilities. Part of Ashfield is designated locally as a historic park and garden.

The village has three Grade II listed war memorials; the Peace Gate at St Wilfrid's Church, a memorial cross at the St Marie's Catholic Church, and Standish Pillar War Memorial in the Victoria Jubilee Memorial Garden (near the Globe pub). The Pillar War Memorial, unveiled in 1920, was dedicated to the men of Standish lost in the First World War; with further inscriptions added after WWII.

In the south of the village is Gidlow Cemetery, which was founded in 1948.

Transport
Standish is on the Wigan to Chorley bus route, with the Arriva North West 362 stopping every 20 minutes. It is also served by the hourly Wigan to Preston Stagecoach Manchester 111 bus and the hourly 640 and 641 Standish Circular busses operated by Diamond North West.

The village was formerly served by two railway stations: Standish railway station to the north and Boar's Head railway station to the south. Both were on the West Coast Main Line and closed in 1949. Standish was also historically served by trams, run by Wigan Corporation Tramways, which ceased operation in 1931.

Standish has a number of footpaths and cycling routes, such as the Standish Mineral Line. Locally known as 'The Line', it underwent a significant upgrade in 2018 as part of the Standish Cycleway project. The Line follows the route of a disused railway, running from the village centre to the former Robin Hill Colliery near Shevington Moor.

Education

Standish has one secondary school, Standish Community High School, which has approximately 1,250 students aged 11–16. Standish also has three primary schools: St. Wilfrid's Church of England Primary Academy, St Marie's Catholic Primary School, and Woodfold Primary School.

Standish has a library in the village centre.

Notable people

 Henry Standish (c.1475–1535), priest
 William Leigh (1550–1639), clergyman
 Ralph Brideoake (c.1612–1678), clergyman
 Henry Finch (1633–1704), Presbyterian minister ejected from Church of England; born in Standish
 Edward Dicconson (1670–1752), bishop
 Charles Walmesley (1722–1797), Roman Catholic Titular Bishop of Rama; born in Langtree
 Leonard Calderbank (1809–1864), priest
 Nathaniel Eckersley (1815–1892), mill owner and MP; born at Standish Hall, Standish
 Thomas Kershaw (1819–1898), pioneer in creating imitation marble; born in Standish
 Charles Appleton (1844–1925), cricketer
 Thorley Smith, (1873–?), politician
 Brian Finch (1936–2007), scriptwriter
 Michael Everitt (1968–), priest
 Sam Darbyshire (1989–), actor
 Ashley Slanina-Davies (1989–), actress
 Mark Waddington (1996–), footballer
 Richard Skelton, musician
 Jack Barton, rugby player

See also 

Listed buildings in Standish, Greater Manchester
Standish family

References

External links

 Standish Voice 
 Coppull and Standish Brass Band
 Historic images of Standish
 Lancashire Genealogy – Standish

 
Geography of the Metropolitan Borough of Wigan
Villages in Greater Manchester